Special elections for the 7th and 15th congressional districts in Pennsylvania were held on November 6, 2018, following the resignations of Republican U.S. Representatives Pat Meehan (7th district) and Charlie Dent (15th district).

Impact of redistricting

These were the last elections held in either district under their configurations made in 2011 by the Pennsylvania Legislature, as new districts drawn in accordance will the ruling of the Supreme Court of Pennsylvania in League of Women Voters v. Commonwealth of Pennsylvania were in effect for the main 2018 congressional elections in November. The bulk of the old 7th became the new  and the bulk of the old 15th became the new . In both cases, the two candidates on the ballot for these special elections were also on the ballot for the regular election held on the same day in their respective successor districts.

District 7

Background
In January 2018, following revelation that he used taxpayers' money to settle a sexual harassment claim brought by a female staff member, Meehan announced that he would retire from Congress at the end of his current term and not seek reelection in 2018. On April 27, 2018, Meehan resigned and said he would pay back the taxpayer funds used for the settlement.

 under the 2011 configuration is located in the Delaware Valley and borders Delaware. It includes portions of Berks County, Chester County, Delaware County, Lancaster County and Montgomery County. The district has a Cook PVI score of R+1.

Candidates
In Pennsylvania, primaries are not held for special congressional elections. Instead, nominees are chosen by party committee members from each of the counties represented in the district.

Republican

Democratic

Green
Brianna Johnston, businesswoman

Libertarian
Sandra Salas, sex worker

General election

Results

District 15

Background
In September 2017, Dent announced that he would retire from Congress and not seek re-election to another term in 2018.  In April 2018, Dent announced that he would resign in May 2018, not serving out the remainder of his term. He resigned on May 12, 2018, leaving the seat vacant.

In Pennsylvania, primaries are not held for special congressional elections. Instead, nominees are chosen by party members from each of the counties represented in the district.

 under the 2011 configuration is located in the Lehigh Valley and borders New Jersey. It includes portions of Dauphin County, Lebanon County, Berks County, and Northampton County, and the entirety of Lehigh County. The district has a Cook PVI score of R+4.

Candidates

Republican nominee

Democratic nominee

Libertarian nominee

General election

Results

References

External links

Official campaign websites of seventh district candidates

Pearl Kim (R) for Congress
Mary Gay Scanlon (D) for Congress

Official campaign websites of fifteenth district candidates

Marty Nothstein (R) for Congress
Susan Wild (D) for Congress

Pennsylvania 2018 07 15
Pennsylvania 07 15
2018 07 15
United States House of Representatives 07 15
United States House of Representatives 2018 07 15
Pennsylvania 2018 07 15